Baekgaard or Bækgaard is a Danish surname. Notable people with the surname include:

Barbara Bradley Baekgaard (born 1939), American fashion designer
Simon Bækgaard (born 1999), Danish footballer
Villy Bækgaard Andersen (born 1938), Danish boxer

Danish-language surnames